Outlawz (formerly known as Outlaw Immortalz) are an American hip hop group founded by rapper Tupac Shakur in late 1995 after Shakur's release from prison. Collectively, they were best known for their association with Shakur. Most of the group members are named after political figures.

Members 

 Rufus "Young Noble" Cooper III, the current co-leader of the Outlawz.
 Malcolm "E.D.I. Mean" Greenridge was named for Ugandan dictator Idi Amin. He is the co-leader of the Outlawz.
 Mopreme "Komani" Shakur, Tupac's stepbrother and was a member of Tupac's previous group Thug Life. He was named for Iranian revolutionary leader Ayatollah Khomeini.
 Donna "Storm" Harkness, is the only female member

Former members
There were six original Outlawz members that left or died.
Tupac "Makaveli" Amaru Shakur was the leader of the group, named for the Italian political philosopher Niccolò Machiavelli, whose writings inspired Shakur in prison. He was shot to death in September 1996. He was named 2Pac, but he was referred to as "Makaveli" in the Outlawz, and he changed his alias from "2Pac" to "Makaveli" while making The Don Killuminati: The 7 Day Theory.
Yafeu "Yaki Kadafi" Akiyele Fula, Tupac's godbrother, was named for Libyan dictator Muammar Gaddafi. He was shot to death in November 1996.
Katari "Kastro" Terrance Cox, Tupac's cousin, was named for Cuban dictator Fidel Castro. He left the group in 2009.
Bruce "Hussein Fatal" Edward Washington Jr., childhood friend of Yaki Kadafi, was named for Iraqi dictator Saddam Hussein. He left the group in 1996. He died in a car accident in 2015.
Mutah "Napoleon" Wassin Shabazz Beale, childhood friend of Kadafi, was named for French emperor Napoleon Bonaparte. After converting to Islam, he left the music industry and became a motivational speaker.
Tyruss Gerald “Mussolini“ Himes, named after Italian fascist dictator Benito Mussolini, was a member in Tupac's previous group Thug Life and is called "Big Syke" outside of the Outlawz. He died of natural causes in 2016.

Later years
In 2011, some band members confirmed the longstanding rumor that they smoked Tupac's ashes.

In 2015, Hussein Fatal died in a car crash.

In 2016, Mussolini died at his home in California.

Discography

Studio albums
 Ride wit Us or Collide wit Us (2000)
 Novakane (2001)
 Neva Surrenda (2002)
 Outlaw 4 Life: 2005 A.P. (2005)
 Against All Oddz (2006)
 We Want In: The Street LP (2008)
 Perfect Timing (2011)
 Livin' Legendz (2016)
 #LastOnezLeft (2017)
 One Nation (2021)

Collaboration albums
 Still I Rise (1999)

References

External links
 

People from Montclair, New Jersey
American hip hop groups
Death Row Records artists
Tupac Shakur
Cashville Records artists
Rappers from New Jersey
East Coast hip hop groups
Hip hop collectives
African-American musical groups
Gangsta rap groups